William Weise (born March 10, 1929) is a retired United States Marine Corps Brigadier General who served in the Vietnam War.

Early life and education
Weise was born in south Philadelphia and graduated from Temple University. He enlisted in the Marine Corps in 1951 in order to use the GI Bill to attend law school.

Military career

Vietnam War
Lt.Col. Weise assumed command of the 2nd Battalion, 4th Marines in October 1967 and commanded them during Operation Napoleon/Saline and at the Battle of Dai Do where he was seriously injured. For his actions at Dai Do Weise was awarded the Navy Cross.

Post-Vietnam
Weise retired from the Marine Corps in 1982 after 31 years of service.

In his role as co-chair of the Marine Corps Heritage Center committee he assisted with the funding and creation of the National Museum of the Marine Corps which opened in 2006.

References

1929 births
United States Marine Corps generals
United States Marine Corps personnel of the Vietnam War
Living people